Lesage, LeSage or Le Sage is a surname. People with the name include:

 Adam Lesage (fl. April 1683), born Cœuret, alias Dubuisson, French occultist, a leading figure in the Affair of the Poisons
 Alain-René Lesage or Le Sage (1668–1747), French novelist and playwright
 Augustin Lesage (1876-1954), French Art Brut painter
 Ben LeSage (born 1995), Canadian rugby union player
 Bill Le Sage (1927–2001), British musician
 Brigitte Lesage (born 1964), French beach volleyball player
 Celine Lesage (born 1971), French murderer
 Charles Alexander Lesage (1843–1893), physician and politician in Quebec, Canada 
 Denis Toussaint Lesage (1758–1796), French politician
 Émile Lesage (1904–1963), Canadian politician from Quebec
 François Lesage (1929–2011), French embroidery designer of Maison Lesage
 Georges-Louis Le Sage (1724–1803), Swiss physicist known for Le Sage's theory of gravitation
 Gilbert Lesage (1910–1989), Quaker charity worker and philanthropist 
 Jean Lesage (1912–1980), Premier of Quebec 1960–1966, after whom Jean-Lesage provincial electoral district in Quebec is named
 Jean-François Lesage, Canadian documentary filmmaker
 Jean-Michel Lesage (born 1977), French footballer
 Jodel Lesage (born 1954), Commander-in-Chief of the Armed Forces of Haiti
 John le Sage (1837–1926), British journalist and newspaper editor
 Joseph Arthur Lesage (1881–1950), member of the Senate of Canada
 Joseph Edmond Lesage (1871–1941), physician and politician in Quebec, Canada
 Nathalie Lesage (born 1993), Mauritian beauty pageant titleholder
 Nicolas Lesage (born 1980), Gabon-born Canadian soccer player
 Odile Lesage (born 1969), French heptathlete
 Patrick LeSage, former Chief Justice of the Supreme Court of Ontario
 Philippe Lesage, Canadian film director and screenwriter
 Raymond Lesage (1917–2006), French racewalker
 Robert LeSage (born 1937), Canadian politician in Quebec, Canada
 Xavier Lesage (1885–1968), French horse rider
 Zénon Lesage (1885–1956), Canadian politician in Quebec

See also